Hebrews 6 is the sixth chapter of the Epistle to the Hebrews in the New Testament of the Christian Bible. The author is anonymous, although the internal reference to "our brother Timothy" (Hebrews 13:23) causes a traditional attribution to Paul, but this attribution has been disputed since the second century and there is no decisive evidence for the authorship. This chapter contains the admonition to progress and persist in faithfulness.

Text
The original text was written in Koine Greek. This chapter is divided into 20 verses.

Textual witnesses
Some early manuscripts containing the text of this chapter are:
Papyrus 46 (175–225; complete)
Codex Vaticanus (325-350)
Codex Sinaiticus (330-360)
Papyrus 89 (4th century; extant verses 7–9, 15–17)
Codex Alexandrinus (400-440)
Codex Ephraemi Rescriptus (~450; complete)
Codex Freerianus (~450; extant verses 1–3, 10–13, 20)
Codex Claromontanus (~550)

Old Testament references
 : 
 :

Admonition (6:1–8)

Verses 4–6
For it is impossible for those who were once enlightened, who have tasted the heavenly gift, who shared in the Holy Spirit, and have tasted the good word of God and the powers of the age to come, if they fall away, to be renewed once more to repentance, since they again crucify to themselves the Son of God and subject Him to public shame.
According to this epistle, there are four things to be 'impossible' (Hebrews 6:4; 6:18; 10:4; 11:6); the first one is about the impossibility to restore apostates, resembling other early Christian expressions regarding what is termed the 'unforgivable sin' (Matthew 12:32; Mark 3:29; Luke 12:10) or the 'sin unto death' (also called the 'mortal sin'), which is also discussed in 1 John 5:16. In rejecting the one whose death brings salvation (verse 6), the apostates join those who disgracefully executed Jesus, whose solemn designation as 'Son of God' reinforces 'the heinousness of apostasy'.

Encouragement to Persevere (6:9–12)

Verse 10
For God is not unjust to forget your work and labor of love which you have shown toward His name, in that you have ministered to the saints, and do minister.
"God is not unjust to forget" is not to focus on the reward for services, but God knows the real situation of people's spiritual lives and he can motivate the expressions of 'genuine Christianity' anytime, just like in the past, also again in the future.

The Steadfastness of God's Promise (6:13–20)

Verse 13
For when God made a promise to Abraham, because He could swear by no one greater, He swore by Himself,

Verse 14
saying, “I will surely bless you and give you many descendants.”

Verse 18
So that by two immutable things, in which it was impossible for God to lie, we who have fled for refuge might have strong encouragement to hold fast to the hope set before us.
This verse contains one of the four things said to be 'impossible' in this epistle (Hebrews 6:4; 6:18; 10:4; 11:6).
"Immutable": or "unchangeable". The 'two unchangeable things' are apparently "the word of God" and "the confirming oath".

Verse 19
 This hope we have as an anchor of the soul, both sure and steadfast, and which enters the Presence behind the veil,
"Anchor of the soul": John Gill cites Pythagoras who spoke about the anchor of soul as follows: "riches (he says) are a weak anchor, glory: is yet weaker; the body likewise; principalities, honours, all these are weak and without strength; what then are strong anchors? prudence, magnanimity, fortitude; these no tempest shakes" (Apud Stobaeum, Serm. I.).
"Behind the veil": One Jewish literature (Zohar in Gen. fol. 73. 3.) speaks of "a veil in the world to come, which some are worthy to enter into".

See also
 Abraham
 High priest
 Jesus Christ
 Melchizedek
 Related Bible parts: Genesis 14, Genesis 21, Genesis 22, Leviticus 16, Numbers 23, Psalm 110, Isaiah 55

References

Sources

External links
 King James Bible - Wikisource
English Translation with Parallel Latin Vulgate
Online Bible at GospelHall.org (ESV, KJV, Darby, American Standard Version, Bible in Basic English)
Multiple bible versions at Bible Gateway (NKJV, NIV, NRSV etc.)

06